H1ghr: Red Tape (stylized as H1GHR : RED TAPE) is the first compilation album of South Korean hip-hop label H1ghr Music released on September 2, 2020. It was nominated for Hip-hop Album of the Year at the Korean Hip-hop Awards and peaked at number 15 on the Gaon Album Chart.

Background 
In an interview with Clash, Jay Park explained why the compilation album was created.
"It was important for H1GHR MUSIC to create the compilation projects because first, we wanted to show everybody what's good with us. To put the newer artists on and to show what type of artists we have and what we are capable of. Secondly, it's to make everybody at the label, not just the artists, realize the synergy we can create when we do things as a team and the strength in it. Why we need each other and how we bring the best out of each other. Lastly, I've never spearheaded a compilation album before so it was simply for the challenge and to elevate the bar when it comes to music, visuals, and how to promote it for the culture."

Music and lyrics 
"DDDD Freestyle" is a "young and energetic track" with "Big Naughty's impressive flow design and witty wordplay, Haon's tight rap, and Woodie Gochild's catchy style". "Closed Case" seems to have "upgraded the sound of Dr. Dre's 2001 in YG fashion." "The Purge" is music "full of passion and cool rhythm" where Woodie Gochild properly heightens the mood in the middle of the song and Jay Park's last verse sounds like that of Kendrick Lamar.

Critical reception 
Hwang Duha of Rhythmer rated the album 3.5 out of 5 stars. According to him, "Melanin Handsome", "How We Rock", "DDDD Freestyle", "Telefono Remix", "The Purge", and "Check My Bio" have "unique production, witty lyrics, and addictive hook" while "4eva", "Closed Case", "World Domination", and "No Rush" are "relatively bland and do not leave a strong impression." He concluded that "even though it has some flaws, it is an excellent compilation album where one can enjoy the best rap performances and sounds."

Awards and nominations

Track listing

Charts

Sales

References 

2020 albums
Korean-language albums
Hip hop albums by South Korean artists